Boxberg may refer to several places in Germany:

Heidelberg-Boxberg, a district of the city of Heidelberg
Boxberg, Baden-Württemberg, a town in Baden-Württemberg
Boxberg, Saxony, a municipality in Upper Lusatia, Saxony
the Boxberg Power Station located there
Boxberg, Rhineland-Palatinate, a municipality in Rhineland-Palatinate